Barrel drums are a class of membranophone, or drum, characterized by a barrel-shape with a bulge in the middle. They are often one-headed and open at the bottom. Examples include the Vietnamese trong chau and the bendre of the Mossi of Burkina Faso. Barrel drum is played horizontally.

Barrel drums
Buk - Korea
Dhak - India
Dhol - India
Dholak - North India, Pakistan, and Nepal
Glong khaek - Thailand
Glong songna - Thailand
Glong thad - Thailand
Kabaro - Ethiopia
Kendhang - Indonesia
Khol - India
Mridangam - South India
Pakhawaj - North India
Sampho - Cambodia
Tanbou - Haiti
Tanggu - China
Taphon - Thailand
Trống chầu - Vietnam

References

Directly struck membranophones
Drums